Cybaeus montanus is a spider species found in Switzerland and Italy.

See also 
 List of Cybaeidae species

References

External links 

Cybaeidae
Spiders described in 1992
Spiders of Europe